Windsor Castle is a former plantation and now a public park in Smithfield, Virginia, United States. It is located in the Smithfield Historic District.

History
Arthur Smith's great grandson, Arthur Smith IV, established the town of Smithfield in 1750. The first recorded use of the name "Windsor Castle" dates from 1884.

In 2005, real estate developer Lewis McMurran obtained an option to purchase Windsor Castle for $2.2 million.  The agreement included a historic easement around the manor house.  McMurran proposed to build a 445-unit "New Urbanism" development on the property outside the historic easement.  The proposal was withdrawn amidst strong opposition from town residents.

In 2007, Joseph W. Luter III donated $5 million to the town for the purchase and development of Windsor Castle as a park.  Lewis McMurran then executed his option to purchase the property.  The town council voted to pursue the use of eminent domain to obtain the property.  In 2009, an out-of-court agreement was negotiated for the town to purchase the property outside the historic easement for $3.8 million and for McMurran to donate to the town the property within the historic easement.

The manor house and surrounding  were dedicated as a public park in 2010.  The  immediately surrounding the manor house are protected by a historic easement controlled by the state of Virginia.  The park was formally opened during a ceremony officiated by the Virginia Governor Bob McDonnell on May 22, 2010.  The park features hiking trails, a dog park, a mountain bike trail, a fishing pier, and a canoe launch.  The manor house overlooks the junction of Cypress Creek and the Pagan River.  The King of All Places manor house (circa 1806) can be seen across Cypress Creek from the Windsor Castle property.

On April 2, 2013, it was reported in the Virginian-Pilot that the Smithfield Town Council has leased five acres at Windsor Castle Park to Smithfield Winery LLC to establish a vineyard for a small-production winery.  The vineyard operation was terminated in 2019.

Gallery

References

Further reading
Seventeenth Century Isle of Wight County, Virginia, by John Bennett Boddie, Heritage Books, 1993.

External links

Google Books - Seventeenth Century Isle of Wight County, Virginia
Preliminary Windsor Park Plan
Visitors Bureau Windsor Castle Webpage
Visitors Bureau Windsor Castle Park Map

Houses completed in 1750
Parks in Isle of Wight County, Virginia
Greek Revival houses in Virginia
Georgian architecture in Virginia
Houses on the National Register of Historic Places in Virginia
Houses in Isle of Wight County, Virginia
Protected areas established in 2010
National Register of Historic Places in Isle of Wight County, Virginia
Individually listed contributing properties to historic districts on the National Register in Virginia